The Fort Wayne City Council is the legislative branch of government for the city of Fort Wayne, Indiana. The council uses a strong mayor system with a separately elected mayor who acts as the executive. There are currently nine members of the council. City council members serve a four-year term and there is no term limit. The council consists of nine members, which 3 are at-large and 6 are representing districts.

Current composition
This is the current composition of the council the president is Thomas F. Didier and the vice president is Paul Ensley. The partisanship of the council is 5 Republicans to 4 Democrat.

References

External links

Government of Fort Wayne, Indiana
Indiana city councils